Santiago Bakero Escudero (born 31 January 1958) is a Spanish former professional footballer who played as a forward and a right-back.

Club career
Born in Goizueta, Navarre, Bakero represented Palencia CF and Hércules CF in Segunda División. He played his first match in the competition while in service of the former club on 2 September 1979 in a 1–1 home draw against Algeciras CF, and scored his first goal the following 20 January to close a 2–2 away draw with Recreativo de Huelva.

Bakero signed with Hércules in early 1983, achieving promotion to La Liga at the end of his first full season and remaining there a further two years. His debut took place on 2 September 1984, in a 1–0 win at Real Zaragoza where he played the full 90 minutes.

In late 1986, Bakero joined Real Sociedad, being often deployed as a right-back and sharing teams with his younger sibling José Mari. He contributed 13 league appearances during the campaign, as the side won the Copa del Rey (three matches from the player, including the 10–1 trouncing of Mallorca Atlético in the quarter-finals).

Bakero retired at the age of 31.

Personal life
Bakero's brothers José Mari and Jon were also footballers, and forwards. His nephew, also named Jon, was also involved in the sport.

Career statistics

Club

Notes

References

External links

1958 births
Living people
People from Norte de Aralar
Spanish footballers
Footballers from Navarre
Association football defenders
Association football forwards
Association football utility players
La Liga players
Segunda División players
Segunda División B players
Palencia CF players
Hércules CF players
Real Sociedad footballers